Myrae or Myrai was a town of Magnesia, ancient Thessaly, on the Aegean coast between Eurymenae and Homolion. Eurymenae was located between Rhizus and Myrae.

The town's location has not been ascertained.

References

Ancient Magnesia
Populated places in ancient Thessaly
Former populated places in Greece
Lost ancient cities and towns